Kim Tae-hyung (born March 17, 1989) is a South Korean footballer who currently plays for Seoul United FC.

FK Senica
He made his debut for Senica against Ružomberok, in OMS Arena on 27 February 2010. He cam as a replacement for Jakub Podaný in the second half. Senica won the game 2:1.

External links
Football-lineups profile

References

1989 births
Living people
Association football forwards
South Korean footballers
South Korean expatriate footballers
FK Senica players
Slovak Super Liga players
K3 League players
Expatriate footballers in Slovakia
South Korean expatriate sportspeople in Slovakia